Kumzari may refer to:

 Kumzari language, an Iranian language spoken in northern Oman
 Kumzari people, an ethnic group of Iranian and Arab origin who speak the language